Hojjatabad (also Romanized as Ḩojjatābād) is a village in Allahabad Rural District, Zarach District, Yazd County, Yazd Province, Iran. At the 2006 census, its population was 11, in 6 families.

References 

Populated places in Yazd County